Live and Learn is an album by Elkie Brooks, released in 1979.

Background 
Released on the back of two singles ("Don't Cry Out Loud" and "The Runaway"), A&M released Live and Learn choosing to omit these songs. Leiber & Stoller returned as producers for the album and gave it a distinct funk and disco feel which, after the middle of the road offerings of the non-album singles, perhaps alienated some of her fanbase. Neither of the singles from this album made the charts which made promotion for this album problematic. As Elkie had become pregnant during the recording A&M, decided to pull back the promotion even further. However, she did continue to perform live until late in her pregnancy.

Single releases 
 "He Could Have Been An Army" (1979)
 "Falling Star" (1979)

Details 
Recorded in 1979 at The Record Plant in Los Angeles, USA. Mastered at A&M Studios, Hollywood, USA.
Live and Learn reached number 34 and remained in the UK charts for 6 weeks.
 Available on CD, paired with its predecessor Shooting Star.

Track listing 
 "Viva La Money" (Allen Toussaint) - (3:23)
 "On the Horizon" (Jerry Leiber, Mike Stoller) - (3:31)
 "He Could Have Been an Army" (Mickey Jupp, Leiber, Stoller) - (4:31)
 "The Rising Cost of Love" (Len Ron Hanks, Zane Grey, Bobby Martin) - (5:01)
 "Dreamdealer" (Leiber, Stoller, Elkie Brooks, Pete Gage) - (4:01)
 "Who's Making Love" (Homer Banks, Don Davis, Bettye Crutcher, Raymond Jackson) - (3:37)
 "If You Can Beat Me Rockin' (You Can Have My Chair)" (Ronald Dunbar, Lamont Dozier, Brian Holland) - (3:22)
 "The Heartache is On" (Leiber, John Sembello) - (3:24)
 "Not Enough Lovin' Left" (Elkie Brooks, Pete Gage, Leiber, Stoller) - (3:48)
 "Falling Star" (Leiber, Stoller) - (4:09)

Personnel 
Elkie Brooks - vocals
Jean Roussel - keyboards

Additional personnel
John Barnes, Mike Stoller - piano/keyboards
Michael Boddicker - synthesizers
Marlow Henderson, Spencer Bean, Paulinho da Costa, Paul Warren, Oliver Leiber, Fred Tackett, Tim May, Adam Chase Benay - guitars
Scott Edwards, Ed Watkins Jr, Brian Garofalo - bass guitar
James Gadson, Ed Greene, Hal Blaine - drums
Corky Hale - harp
Lenny Pickett - woodwind
Tower of Power Horn Section
Mic Gillette
Greg Adams
Lenny Pickett
Emilio Castillo
Steve Kupka
Jim Decker
Alan Robinson
Marni Robinson.
 Venetta Fields, Darlene Love, Julia Tillman Waters, Maggie Henry, Jim Gilstrap, Oren Waters, Edna Wright - backing vocals
Michael Stone, Kevin Eddy - engineering
Bernie Grundman - mastering
Jerry Leiber & Mike Stoller - production

References 

1979 albums
Elkie Brooks albums
Albums produced by Jerry Leiber
Albums produced by Mike Stoller
A&M Records albums